Coxford is a village in the English county of Norfolk.

The village is on the south side of the A 148 King's Lynn to Cromer road.  The River Tat, which is a tributary of the River Wensum, runs through the village.

Close to the village are the grade II* listed remains of the Augustinian St Mary's Priory.

References

External links

Villages in Norfolk
King's Lynn and West Norfolk